John Mowbray Didcott (1931–1998) was a South African lawyer, judge and a Justice of the Constitutional Court of South Africa from the court's opening on 14 February 1995 until his death. Didcott was known for his firm support of human rights during 23 years on the bench in and after the apartheid era.

Biography 

Didcott was born on 14 August 1931 in Durban. After matriculating at Hilton College, near Pietermaritzburg in 1948 he went to the University of Cape Town (UCT) where he obtained a BA in 1951 and an LLB in 1953. At university he involved himself in student politics and gained a reputation as a powerful public speaker. He was twice elected president of the UCT Students' representative council and later became President of the National Union of South African Students. Didcott was a founder member of the Liberal Party of South Africa, which brought him to the attention of the security police.

In 1953 he was awarded an Abe Bailey Travel Bursary to the United Kingdom. He was also a member of the team representing the International Student Conference, which visited universities in Southeast Asia for six months in 1955 and 1956.

After graduating, Didcott was admitted to the Bar in Cape Town on 26 February 1954, but then joined the Cape Argus for a year as Supreme Court reporter. That experience alerted him to the difficulties and challenges faced by journalists and the media, and he was always an avid reader of newspapers, although often critical of their shortcomings.

In July 1956 Didcott moved to Durban to set up chambers.  Shortly thereafter (during the 1960 State of Emergency he was tipped off that the security police planned to detain him for his political activities, and he fled the country to Southern Rhodesia, where he spent some months as a prosecutor until it was safe to return. He returned to the Durban Bar where he built up a successful legal practice. He took silk (appointed a Senior Counsel) on 19 July 1967 and was Chairman of the Bar from 1973 to 1975. He served as an acting judge of the Natal Provincial Division in 1971 and again in 1975. In June 1975, at the comparatively young age of 44, he was invited to take an appointment as a judge. For someone with strong liberal principles it involved careful thought. He had to balance the problem of administering apartheid legislation with the possibility of making a difference on the Bench and somehow helping to alleviate the impact of unjust laws. Convinced of the useful contribution he could make, he accepted. However, his decision and that of like-minded judges -was publicly challenged some years later when Natal University law professor Raymond Wacks urged that all 'moral judges' should resign. Judge Didcott had no time for this view.

In 1994 he became a member of the Special Electoral Court for South Africa's first fully democratic general election in 1994 and later that year he was appointed to the Constitutional Court.

Awards and honours 

In April 1991, in recognition of his contribution to the University and of his attempts to promote justice in an unjust society, the University of Natal awarded the degree of Doctor of Laws, Honoris Causa to him. His contribution to law and society was also recognised by the University of Durban-Westville, which made him its Chancellor in 1989. He also received honorary degrees from the University of Cape Town and the University of the Witwatersrand.

Didcott was also appointed as an honorary professor in the Department of Procedural and Clinical Law at the University of Natal in 1989.

Judge Didcott served on the Constitutional Court from its inception in 1994 until his death in 1998. He died on 20 October 1998, after a battle with cancer.

Human rights 

Didcott was the one judge on the South African bench who never sentenced anybody to death. When asked how he could maintain that record, he said he always found a reason, questioned further on if he was not able to find a reason, he responded, 'Then I'd resign.'

Prof. Jack Greenberg of Columbia Law School, an authority on civil rights law, said

The rights of an accused to legal representation 

In S v Khanyile and Another 1988 (3) SA 795 (N), Didcott (sitting with Friedman) considered the rights of an accused to legal representation and emphasised the role of the Bench in assessing the totality of circumstances to decide if gross unfairness would result if an accused is not represented. The judgment went as far as to say that if the judge concluded that a trial without representation would be grossly unfair, he should refer the case at once to those administering the legal aid scheme or similar organisation and should refuse to proceed with the trial until representation was procured.

In S v Mthwana 1989 (4) SA 361 (N) a full bench (consisting of Howard JP, Booysen and JH Combrink JJ) of the division criticised and effectively overruled the decision in Khanyile, which had already been criticised in other divisions. The Appellate Division sided with Mthwana.

Didcott, sitting in the Constitutional Court in S v Vermaas; S v Du Plessis 1995 (3) SA 292 (CC), had the last word in holding that the controversy 'has been settled decisively by our new Constitution, the Constitution of the Republic of South Africa Act 200 of 1993, s 25(3)(e)' that essentially codified the principles advanced in Khanyile.

Justice and morality 

Under the apartheid system the law had become a corrupt system.  The legal system in South Africa had been in the great tradition, with its roots in Roman-Dutch law and the common law of England. But when the National Party (South Africa) won power in 1948, it quickly began to distort the system to formalise racial discrimination and entrench itself in power. A judgement by Didcott shows he was a man of compassion, with a true sense of justice.

Publications

Notes

References

Monographs

Journal articles

News articles

Websites 

 

 

1931 births
1998 deaths
Judges of the Constitutional Court of South Africa
South African judges
People from Durban
South African people of British descent
20th-century South African lawyers
South African Senior Counsel
Alumni of Hilton College (South Africa)